Frank Joseph Caggiano (born March 29, 1959) is an American prelate of the Roman Catholic Church who has been serving as the Bishop of Bridgeport in Connecticut since 2013. He previously served as an auxiliary bishop of the Diocese of Brooklyn in New York City from 2006 to 2013.

Biography

Early life
Frank Caggiano was born on March 29, 1959, in the Gravesend section of Brooklyn, New York, the younger of two children of Arnaldo and Gennarina Caggiano. His parents were Italian immigrants who came to the United States from the town of Caggiano, in the province of Salerno, in 1958. He has an older sister, Antonia. His parents originally wanted to name him Francesco after his grandfather, however, a nurse mistakenly placed Frank on birth forms, which his parents reluctantly accepted.

Caggiano grew up in southern Brooklyn on Van Sicklen Street.  He attended mass each Sunday morning at their parish of Saints Simon and Jude. He attended Saints Simon and Jude Elementary School in Gravesend, Brooklyn, and graduated from Regis High School in Manhattan in 1977. He then entered Yale University in New Haven, Connecticut, `as a political science major, but later decided to enter the priesthood. This sudden shift from Yale to the priesthood disappointed Arnaldo Caggiano, who opposed his son's priestly inclinations, even though Caggiano himself was still unsure of his vocation.

In 1978, Frank Caggiano entered Cathedral College in Douglaston, Queens, graduating with a Bachelor of Philosophy degree in 1981. Upon graduating from Cathedral College, Caggiano worked for the Gregg Division of McGraw Hill Publishing Company for eighteen months. He then entered the Seminary of the Immaculate Conception in Huntington, New York, earning a Master of Divinity degree.

Priesthood
Caggiano was ordained a priest for the Diocese of Brooklyn by Bishop Francis Mugavero on May 16, 1987 in Douglaston. After his ordination, Caggiano was appointed as associate pastor at Saint Agatha Parish in Bay Ridge and at Saint Athanasius Church in Bensonhurst, both in Brooklyn, until August 1991. After serving in ministry for a few years, Caggiano studied in Rome at the Pontifical Gregorian University, earning a Doctor of Sacred Theology in May 1996: His thesis was entitled: The Eschatological Implications of the Notion of Recreation in the Works of St. Cyril of Alexandria. While in Rome, Caggiano was assigned to the Pontifical North American College.

After returning to Brooklyn in June 1996, Caggiano was assigned as associate pastor of Saint Jude Parish in Canarsie, as dean of formation for the Permanent Diaconate Program and as censor librorum for the diocese. He became the pastor of Saint Dominic's Parish in Bensonhurst in 1998 and taught theology at Saint John's University's Staten Island campus and at Saint Joseph's College in Brooklyn. He also preached at the Youth 2000 Summer Festival in Tipperary, Ireland. Caggiano was named director of the Permanent Diaconate Office in 2002 and later vicar for evangelization and pastoral life in 2004.

Caggiano was raised to the rank of papal chaplain by Pope John Paul II in 2003. In 2004, Bishop Nicholas DiMarzio appointed Caggiano as the diocesan vicar for evangelization and pastoral life, which also came with directing several offices under that responsibility.

Auxiliary bishop of Brooklyn 
On June 6, 2006, Caggiano was appointed as an auxiliary bishop of the Diocese of Brooklyn and titular bishop of Inis Cathaig by Pope Benedict XVI. He received his episcopal consecration on August 22, 2006, from Bishop DiMarzio, with Bishops Thomas Daily and Ignatius Catanello serving as co-consecrators. Caggiano participated in several World Youth Day gatherings, delivering catechetical talks in Sydney (2008), Madrid (2011) and Rio de Janeiro (2013).

In 2009, the diocese closed fourteen schools; Caggiano was selected by DiMarzio to lead the reorganization effort and conceded that prior school closings generally led to job losses and that the current reorganization efforts (to be completed prior to the end of the academic year) would more than likely result in job losses for some people. He also was put in charge of consolidating 46 parishes and reducing the Catholic grade schools from 108 to about 65 or 70 while converting the rest into independent Catholic academies.

Bishop of Bridgeport
On July 31, 2013, Pope Francis appointed Caggiano as bishop of the Diocese of Bridgeport. He was installed there on September 19, 2013. One of Caggiano's first actions as bishop was to publicly announce the financial deficit incurred before his installation, and to mandate that pastors serve six-year renewable periods at parishes and would be required to submit their resignations when they turned 75, much like bishops did.

In 2014, Caggiano convoked the 4th Synod of the Diocese of Bridgeport, the first in 32 years (themed "Building Bridges to the Future Together"). In an interview with America Magazine, Caggiano said that one of his first priorities as bishop is reaching out to the high percentage of Catholics in the diocese, who for whatever reasons, no longer attend mass. One of the major concerns that the synod focused on was the decline in mass attendance and sacramental reception as well as the need to bolster Catholic schools due to declining enrollment.

In April 2019, Fairfield University's Murphy Center in Fairfield, Connecticut, awarded  Caggiano the "Bowler Award". In November 2019, Caggiano was elected to the board of Catholic Relief Services and then named to a three-year term as its chair. Of that appointment, Caggiano said in a statement issued on November 25, 2019 that it was an honor for him to lead an organization dedicated to people "who don't have enough to eat or a place to sleep because of entrenched poverty".

In 2018, Caggiano announced that liturgical norms and regulations in the diocese would be revised over the next four-year period as a result of discussions from the diocesan synod. Caggiano said on October 1, 2018, that these newer regulations would "allow us to pray effectively and reverently as a Church" and would be the newest norms implemented since 1983.

During the COVID-19 pandemic in 2020, Caggiano issued directives to cease public masses on a temporary basis and would go on to livestream his masses for people to virtually participate in. Caggiano reasoned that closing churches was per "our common moral obligation to protect human life" and reduce transmission in the virus. Additionally, he noted in a Facebook post that suspending all public masses was important for community safety, and was in accordance to "the central Catholic belief in the sanctity of every human life". However, the diocese also announced that one particular format for the mass in person would be arranged to social distancing norms for only 50 people while others can participate via their car in parking lots, still socially distant in the case of an emergency. Caggiano later announced an easing in restrictions on mass attendance based on a reopening process in conjunction with steps taken by neighboring dioceses.

In order to evangelize on a broader level (per one of his pastoral commitments upon his installation), Caggiano maintains a Facebook and Twitter account where he publishes small reflections updated regularly. In June 2021, Caggiano announced the formation and development of a national catechetical institute. The initiative is to include Hispanic inculturation. The virtual launch was set for December 2020, with a live conference anticipated in Baltimore by November 2022.

Sexual abuse reporting
Caggiano commissioned a report released in October 2019 from former state Superior Court Judge Robert Holzberg into the Diocese's handling of accusations of sexual abuse by its priests. Holzberg found that since 1953 some 71 priests had abused almost 300 people, with most cases dating to the 1960s and 1970s and none since 2008. He detailed how three bishops over forty years had consistently failed to fulfill their moral and legal responsibilities. Caggiano also said on October 3, 2019 that victims "need to remain at the center of all of our efforts because they are our brothers and sisters" which meant that "moving forward does not mean leaving them behind".

Views and theology

Abortion
Caggiano released a reflection on January 25, 2019 in which he referred to the legalization of abortion rights for women as disturbing and as a failure on the part of contemporary American society. In June 1997, he gave an address in which he said that life must be preserved and defended from the moment of conception since an unborn child was "of infinite value" due to its origins in God's love.

Euthanasia
In June 1997, the then-Father Caggiano gave an address in which he lamented that "contemporary society continues to undermine all attempts to respect and defend human life", referring to an imminent U.S. Supreme Court ruling on physician-assisted suicide which Caggiano said "represents a subtle form of euthanasia". He elaborated that refusing to contribute to the defense of human life only contributed to a "culture of death" that would usher in dramatic societal shifts towards life and death.

Same-sex marriage
In 2015, Caggiano issued a statement lamenting the Supreme Court's 5–4 decision that same-sex marriages were nationally constitutional. Caggiano joined other Catholic dioceses in opposing the ruling, reflecting that the decision was indicative of "rapidly shifting attitudes in our secular American society", however, pointing out that this did not deter the church's official magisterium or "its understanding of sacramental marriage".  Caggiano further stated that "the Church clearly teaches that the sacrament of marriage is a covenant of love that can be entered into only by a man and a woman", and that a change in civil law was only proof that the Church needed to continue to make the effort "to become a more welcoming Church".

Youth
Caggiano attended the Synod of Bishops in 2018 dedicated to the youth. Caggiano said that the church needed to act transparently in order to secure trust on the part of young people left scandalized by scandals. He further said that there was a need to make outreach to young people a crucial pastoral focus for any episcopacy.

In an interview given to the National Catholic Register on July 10, 2017, Caggiano said that young people "are facing their own unique challenges and want someone to listen to them", therefore necessitating the need for pastors to be able to respond to them through modern technological innovations that can draw them closer to young people and the youth to the Church. Caggiano further said that striving for personal holiness and to "proclaim the Good News" were focal points for a youth ministry so that the youth were not forgotten. Having attended several World Youth Day events, Caggiano said that it was exceptional to see millions of young people gathering together from all parts of the world under a common faith.

Interfaith dialogue
On December 22, 2015, Caggiano attended a prayer service with Jewish and Muslim leaders in front of the Margaret E. Morton Government Center in Bridgeport "to alert people to the sin of discrimination and to stand in solidarity with those who are in need". He decried those attacks motivated by religious discrimination and hatred, noting the "growing menace of terrorism and violence" in a Facebook post he wrote shortly after the event.  He also noted that "unfortunately there are few who, in the name of God, are perpetrating terrible acts of evil". Caggiano pointed out that different religions needed to come together to reject religiously-motivated violence in order "to search for peace, understanding and a spirit of tolerance".

Caggiano also condemned the spraying of anti-Semitic graffiti at the diocesan cathedral, referring to "this brazen and disgusting display of anti-Semitism which is morally abhorrent and an affront to our Catholic faith" in a statement issued on January 5, 2019. He further said that "to use a clearly anti-Semitic symbol is participating in unspeakable evil" and that it was a distressing occurrence given that there was a growing need to mutually respect other religions.

Racism
Caggiano issued a statement on Twitter following the murder of George Floyd in Minneapolis, Minnesota, in late May 2020, in which he said that "we must once again confront the evil of systematic racism, bigotry, and discrimination in our country".

Clerical sex abuse scandal
Caggiano, shortly after his installation in Bridgeport, told the National Catholic Reporter in an interview that it was important "to rebuild trust in the Church, among people in the Church", particularly with those younger people who leave due to feeling scandalized by the impact the crisis has. He said that rebuilding trust was dependent upon transparency and authenticity which he hoped to demonstrate consistently in his episcopacy.

See also

 Catholic Church hierarchy
 Catholic Church in the United States
 Historical list of the Catholic bishops of the United States
 List of Catholic bishops of the United States
 Lists of patriarchs, archbishops, and bishops

References

External links 
Roman Catholic Diocese of Bridgeport

1959 births
Living people
People from Gravesend, Brooklyn
Roman Catholic bishops of Bridgeport
Yale University alumni
St. John's University (New York City)
Pontifical Gregorian University alumni
Regis High School (New York City) alumni
Bishops of Iniscathay
Catholics from New York (state)
American people of Italian descent
21st-century Roman Catholic bishops in the United States
Bishops appointed by Pope Benedict XVI